Visappu (Hunger) is a collection of short stories by Vaikom Muhammad Basheer published in 1954. The collection includes Basheer's first story "Ente Thankam" (My Darling) which is titled "Thankam" in the book. This story originally appeared in the Ernakulam-based newspaper Jayakesari in the year 1937. The other stories include "Visappu" (Hunger), "Marunnu" (Medicine) and "Pishachu" (Devil). Visappu is considered as a modern classic in south Asian literature.

List of stories
 "Thankam"
 "Shashinas"
 "Hridayanatha"
 "Marunnu"
 "Nammude Hridayangal"
 "Pishachu"
 "Visappu"

References

1954 short story collections
Short story collections by Vaikom Muhammad Basheer
Malayalam-language books
Malayalam short stories
Indian short story collections